The Ashley River (officially Ashley River / Rakahuri) is in Canterbury region of New Zealand. It flows generally southeastwards for  before entering the Pacific Ocean at Waikuku Beach, Pegasus Bay north of Christchurch. The town of Rangiora is close to the south bank of the Ashley River. The river's official name was changed from Ashley River to the dual name Ashley River / Rakahuri by the Ngāi Tahu Claims Settlement Act 1998.

Though the lower reaches of the river are braided, part of the upper river flows through a canyon known as the Ashley Gorge.

The river emanates from mountains in the west Lees Valley adjacent to Island Hills station and exits the hills at a gorge near Oxford township. It has tributaries of Duck Creek in this valley and is an accumulator of watershed between Lees Valley and Oxford township.

Behind Waikuku Beach is one of the largest, least modified estuaries in New Zealand. It is abundant in bird life, including the wrybill (Anarhynchus frontalis) and Black stilt (Himantopus novaezelandiae). Many migratory birds over-winter here. Surveys from 2000 to 2015, after work to clear weeds and pests, showed significant increases in banded dotterel, wrybill, black-fronted tern, and pied stilt, but black-billed gull, spur-winged plover and southern black-backed gull didn't change significantly.

Floods 
In February 1868, June 1905 and May 1923 flooding from this river extended as far as Kaiapoi. Major floods also occurred in March 1902, February 1936, March 1941, February 1945, January 1953, December 1993 and 2013.  of stopbanks have been built from the 1930s and have contained the floods since 1953, being enlarged in 1976 and 2018. On the north bank they extend from the railway bridge to the coast and on the south bank to Mount Thomas Road.

Bridges

Cones Road Bridge 

It is built of hollow-core concrete beams and has 2 road lanes, 2 cycleways and a footpath. The original bridge was built in 1897.

Railway Bridge 
The bridge opened with the Rangiora to Ashley section of the Northern Railway on 17 April 1875. In April 1951 a pier and two iron girders were washed away in a flood. It was replaced by a  bridge to the east on 18 December 1961.

Main North Road Bridge 
The first bridge was completed in 1866. It was initially a toll bridge, but by 1867 had been bought by the Provincial Council. After floods, it was lengthened in 1868. Floods had also closed it in 1870, It is now part of State Highway 1 and was repaired and strengthened in 2019.

References

External links 
Photos -

 pre 1961 railway bridge
 pre 1936 road bridge
 1936 North Rd bridge being built
 1937 photos of old and new bridge
 Cones Rd bridge in 1930s and 2011
 Flood in August 2000

Rivers of Canterbury, New Zealand
Waimakariri District
Rivers of New Zealand